Farrands is a surname. Notable people with the surname include:

Daniel Farrands (born 1969), American filmmaker
Frank Farrands (1835–1916), English cricketer and umpire
John Farrands (1921–1996), Australian public servant and scientist

See also
Farrand